The 1978–79 Nationale A season was the 58th season of the Ligue Magnus, the top level of ice hockey in France. 10 teams participated in the league, and Chamonix Hockey Club won their 30th league title. CPM Croix was relegated to the Nationale B.

First round

Final round

Relegation

External links
Season on hockeyarchives.info

Fra
1978–79 in French ice hockey
Ligue Magnus seasons